The   (princely house) was the seventh oldest collateral branch (ōke) of the Japanese Imperial Family created from the Fushimi-no-miya, the oldest of the four branches of the imperial dynasty allowed to provide a successor to the Chrysanthemum throne should the main imperial line fail to produce an heir.

The Kaya-no-miya house was formed in 1892 as an ad personam title for Prince Kuninori, the second son of Prince Kuni Asahiko. Emperor Meiji authorized it to become an independent ōke household in 1900.

On October 14, 1947, Prince Kaya Tsunenori and his family lost their imperial status and became ordinary citizens, as part of the American Occupation's abolition of the collateral branches of the Japanese Imperial family. The direct line of the Kaya-no-miya house ended with the death of Prince Kaya Tsunenori’s eldest son, Prince Kaya Kuninaga in 1986. However, the Kaya family line continues through the children of Prince Kaya Tsunenori’s third son, Kaya Akinori.

The Kaya-no-miya palace was located in the Chiyoda district of Tokyo. The site is now occupied by the Chidorigafuchi National Cemetery.

References 

 Lebra, Sugiyama Takie. Above the Clouds: Status Culture of the Modern Japanese Nobility. University of California Press (1995).